Emil Spirea (born 8 February 1969) is a retired Romanian football defender.

References

1969 births
Living people
Romanian footballers
Liga I players
FC Brașov (1936) players
FC Politehnica Iași (1945) players
ASC Oțelul Galați players
CSM Roman (football) players
AFC Dacia Unirea Brăila players
Association football defenders